Sara Bossio (born 7 April 1938 in Montevideo) is a Uruguayan lawyer and former judge.

From 2006 to 2008 she was a member of the Supreme Court of Justice, presiding over it in 2007–2008.

References

1938 births
People from Montevideo
Uruguayan women lawyers
Uruguayan judges
Uruguayan women jurists
Supreme Court of Uruguay justices
Living people